Blackallia is a genus of flowering plants belonging to the family Rhamnaceae.

Its native range is Western Australia.

Species:

Blackallia nudiflora

References

Rhamnaceae
Rhamnaceae genera